The 1999 Women's South American Volleyball Championship was the 23rd edition of the Women's South American Volleyball Championship, organised by South America's governing volleyball body, the Confederación Sudamericana de Voleibol (CSV). It was held in Valencia, Carabobo, Venezuela

Teams

Competition System
The competition system for the 1999 Women's South American Championship consisted of three rounds, with Brazil, Peru and Venezuela automatically playing the second round, the other four teams played a single Round-Robin system. Each team played once against each of the 3 remaining teams. Points were accumulated during the first round and the top team advanced to second round. The second round saw another Round-Robin pool, points were again accumulated during the second round and the top two team advanced to play for the gold while the bottom two teams played for bronze.

First round

Standings

|}

Matches

|}

Second round

Standings

|}

Matches

|}

Final round

Third place

|}

First place

|}

Final standing

References

External links
CSV official website

Women's South American Volleyball Championships
South American Volleyball Championships
Volleyball
1999 in South American sport
International volleyball competitions hosted by Venezuela
September 1999 sports events in South America